The Chinese national ice hockey team  is the national men's ice hockey team of the People's Republic of China. The team is controlled by the Chinese Ice Hockey Association and a member of the International Ice Hockey Federation (IIHF).

Tournament record

Olympic Games
2022 – 12th place

World Championship record
1972 – 18th place (5th in Pool C)
1973 – 19th place (5th in Pool C)
1974 – 20th place (6th in Pool C)
1978 – 20th place (4th in Pool C)
1979 – 18th place (Pool B)
1981 – 18th place (2nd in Pool C). Promoted to Pool B
1982 – 15th place (6th in Pool B). Relegated to Pool C
1983 – 19th place (3rd in Pool C)
1985 – 19th place (3rd in Pool C)
1986 – 18th place (2nd in Pool C). Promoted to Pool B
1987 – 16th place (8th in Pool B). Relegated to Pool C
1989 – 19th place (3rd in Pool C)
1990 – 19th place (3rd in Pool C)
1991 – 18th place (2nd in Pool C). Promoted to Pool B
1992 – 19th place (7th in Pool B)
1993 – 19th place (7th in Pool B)
1994 – 20th place (8th in Pool B). Relegated to Pool C
1995 – 25th place (Pool C)
1996 – 27th place (Pool C)
1997 – 27th place (7th in Pool C)
1998 – 28th place (4th in Pool C)
1999 – 28th place (4th in Pool C)
2000 – 26th place (2nd in Pool C). Promoted to Division I
2001 – 27th place (5th in Division I, Group B)
2002 – 28th place (6th in Division I, Group B). Relegated to Division II
2003 – 32nd place (2nd in Division II, Group B)
2004 – 30th place (1st in Division II, Group A). Promoted to Division I
2005 – 28th place (6th in Division I, Group A). Relegated to Division II
2006 – 30th place (1st in Division II, Group B). Promoted to Division I
2007 – 28th place (6th in Division I, Group A). Relegated to Division II
2008 – 32nd place (2nd in Division II, Group B)
2009 – 34th place (3rd in Division II, Group A)
2010 – 38th place (5th in Division II, Group B)
2011 – 36th place (4th in Division II, Group B)
2012 – 36th place (2nd in Division II, Group B)
2013 – 38th place (4th in Division II, Group B)
2014 – 38th place (4th in Division II, Group B)
2015 – 35th place (1st in Division II, Group B) Promoted to Division II, Group A
2016 – 34th place (6th in Division II, Group A) Relegated to Division II, Group B
2017 – 35th place (1st in Division II, Group B) Promoted to Division II, Group A
2018 – 32nd place (4th in Division II, Group A)
2019 – 33rd place (5th in Division II, Group A)
2020 – Cancelled due to the COVID-19 pandemic
2021 – Cancelled due to the COVID-19 pandemic
2022 – 27th place (1st in Division II, Group A) Promoted to Division I, Group B

Asian Games
1986 – 1st 
1990 – 1st 
1996 – 3rd 
1999 – 3rd 
2003 – 3rd 
2007 – 4th
2011 – 4th
2017 – 4th

Current Roster

Roster for the 2022 Men's Olympic Ice Hockey Tournament 

Head coach:  Ivano Zanatta

References

 Official site of the Chinese Olympic Committee:  Chinese Ice Hockey Association: 2004-02-05 09:35:00. Retrieved 2007-07-19.

External links

IIHF profile
National Teams of Ice Hockey

Ice hockey teams in China
National ice hockey teams in Asia
Ice hockey